Trombiculinae is a subfamily of chiggers belonging to the family Trombiculidae.

References

Trombiculidae
Arthropod subfamilies